Donald J. McConnell (born 1939) is an American diplomat. He was born in Ohio in 1939, and served as the United States Ambassador to Burkina Faso from 1993 to 1996 and to Eritrea from 2001 to 2004.

References

Ambassadors of the United States to Burkina Faso
Ambassadors of the United States to Eritrea
1939 births
Living people
John Carroll University alumni
Stanford University alumni
Harvard Kennedy School alumni
United States Foreign Service personnel
20th-century American diplomats
21st-century American diplomats